San Francisco is a settlement in Dibulla Municipality, La Guajira Department in Colombia.

Climate
San Francisco has a tropical monsoon climate (Am) with moderate to little rainfall from December to March and heavy to very heavy rainfall from April to November.

References

Populated places in the Guajira Department